The Stratos Hydroelectric Dam is a dam on the river Acheloos in Aetolia-Acarnania, western Greece. It is situated just east of the village Stratos, and 9 km northwest of Agrinio. The dam created the Stratos artificial lake. There are four more dams upstream from the Stratos Dam: the Kastraki Dam, the Kremasta Dam, the Sykia Dam and the Mesochora Dam.

The dam was constructed between 1981 and 1989. Four turbine units produce up to 156.7 MW of electricity.

See also

List of lakes in Greece
Renewable energy in Greece

References

Hydroelectric power stations in Greece
Dams in Greece
Dams completed in 1989
Earth-filled dams
Dams on the Achelous River
1989 establishments in Greece
Energy infrastructure completed in 1989
Buildings and structures in Aetolia-Acarnania